Reidar Merli (1 April 1917 – 29 December 2007) was a Norwegian wrestler. He was born in Aurskog-Høland, and represented the club Kolbotn IL. He competed in Greco-Roman wrestling at the 1948 Summer Olympics in London, where he placed sixth (shared), and at the 1952 Summer Olympics in Helsinki, where he placed fifth.

References

External links
 

1917 births
2007 deaths
People from Aurskog-Høland
Wrestlers at the 1948 Summer Olympics
Wrestlers at the 1952 Summer Olympics
Norwegian male sport wrestlers
Olympic wrestlers of Norway
Sportspeople from Viken (county)
20th-century Norwegian people
21st-century Norwegian people